V. J. Keefe Memorial Stadium was a multi-use stadium in San Antonio, Texas, USA. It was initially used as the stadium of San Antonio Missions games.  It was replaced by Nelson W. Wolff Municipal Stadium for the Missions in 1994. The stadium opened in 1960 and had a final capacity 3,500 spectators.

The stadium was located on the campus of St. Mary's University and continued to be used by the school's baseball team until 2013. It was replaced by Dickson Stadium, which was built upon the steel structure of the old venue.

References

Baseball venues in San Antonio
College baseball venues in the United States
Minor league baseball venues
Baseball venues in Texas
1960 establishments in Texas
Sports venues completed in 1960